Jenpeg Airport  is located  southwest of Jenpeg, Manitoba, Canada.

References

External links

Registered aerodromes in Manitoba